Paul Martin Shields (born 15 August 1981) is a Scottish footballer who has played as a striker in the Scottish Premier Division for Celtic, as well as clubs in both the Scottish and English Football Leagues. who plays for Kelty Hearts in the Scottish Junior Football Association, East Region.

Career
Shields began his professional career with Raith Rovers in 1998 and his early form earned him a spell training with Tottenham Hotspur the following year. He joined Celtic in March 2000 for a fee of £100,000, becoming then manager Kenny Dalglish's last signing for the club. Shields made one substitute appearance for the Parkhead side towards the end of the season, being loaned to Albion Rovers in the early stages of the 2000–01 season.

Following his return in December 2000, Shields failed to add to his solitary appearance for Celtic and was loaned out again in February 2002 to Clydebank. At the start of the following season, Shields undertook his third loan spell, this time with Queen of the South and when he returned to Celtic Park in January 2003, he was promptly released, joining Clyde on a short-term deal. With no permanent deal on offer, Shields joined Forfar Athletic on a one-year deal in July 2003, subsequently agreeing a new two-year deal at the end of the season. In the first half of 2005, Forfar rejected approaches from Stranraer and Grimsby Town, although Gillingham secured his signature in a £25,000 deal. Shields made just six league starts for The Gills before being released in May 2006, and he quickly joined Livingston.

In August 2007, Shields was released from Livi on his 26th birthday, allowing him to move with fellow player Daryl Smylie to Swedish side Östersunds FK.

Shields took a year out of the game after his spell in Sweden, before joining Junior side Bo'ness United in August 2009. During his spell at Bo'ness, he helped the club to the East Superleague title in 2009–10. In the following seasons Scottish Cup, Shields scored the winning goal in a second round tie against Scottish Football League side Queen's Park. He joined Broxburn Athletic in January 2011 before signing for Bonnyrigg Rose Athletic later that year.

Shields left Bonnyrigg in March 2013.

Post playing career
Since retiring from playing, he has worked in masseur roles for Hearts and Rangers.

Statistics
Correct after 11 September 2008

References

External links
 

1981 births
Footballers from Dunfermline
Living people
Scottish footballers
Scottish Football League players
Scottish Premier League players
Scottish Junior Football Association players
Raith Rovers F.C. players
Celtic F.C. players
Albion Rovers F.C. players
Clydebank F.C. (1965) players
Queen of the South F.C. players
Clyde F.C. players
Forfar Athletic F.C. players
Gillingham F.C. players
Livingston F.C. players
Ayr United F.C. players
Östersunds FK players
Bo'ness United F.C. players
Bonnyrigg Rose Athletic F.C. players
Expatriate footballers in Sweden
Broxburn Athletic F.C. players
Association football forwards